Fremington is a hamlet in the Yorkshire Dales in North Yorkshire, England. The hamlet is almost joined to Reeth and Grinton. It is split into Low Fremington which is built along the B6270 and High Fremington which is a scattering of houses running up towards Fremington Edge.

The origin of the place-name is from the Old English words Fremi  (or Frema), ing and tun and means estate associated with a man named Fremi (or Frema).  It appears as Fremington in the Domesday Book of 1086.

In the 19th-century a hoard of 1st-century Roman horse harness fittings, known as the Fremington Hagg Hoard, was found near Fremington.

References

External links

Villages in North Yorkshire
Swaledale